Beaufort is a former rural locality in the Barcaldine Region, Queensland, Australia. On 22 November 2019 the Queensland Government decided to amalgamate the localities in the Barcaldine Region, resulting in five expanded localities based on the larger towns: Alpha, Aramac, Barcaldine, Jericho and Muttaburra. Beaufort was incorporated into Alpha.

Geography 
The southern boundary of the locality is the Central Western railway line and, to its immediate south, the Capricorn Highway. The Mamboo railway station services the locality and Sedgeford to the north.

The Belyando River flows through the locality from the south-east (Port Wine) to the north-west (Surbiton/Quetta). Being east of the Great Dividing Range, the river is part of the North East Coast drainage basin. It is a tributary of the Suttor River, which in turn is a tributary of the Burdekin River, which flows into the Coral Sea at Rita Island in the Shire of Burdekin.

The principal land use is grazing on native vegetation.

History 
The locality presumably takes its name from the county, which in turn is named after Mount Beaufort, which in turn is named 20 July 1846 by Sir Thomas Mitchell after Rear-Admiral Sir Frances Beaufort, creator of the Beaufort Scale for indicating wind force.

In 1863 Arthur Hunter Palmer (Premier of Queensland from 1870 to 1874) leased nine pastoral runs in the Belyando Valley which he collectively called Beaufort Station. Over the years, he expanded or reduced the size of station, selling it finally in 1897.

Mamboo railway station was established in 1954. Queensland Railways Department assigned the name Mamboo on 5 July 1954. It is an Aboriginal word in the  Kabi language, meaning dogwood tree. However this is not an Indigenous language used in the area.

Education 
There are no schools in Beaufort. The nearest primary school is in Alpha which also has the nearest secondary school, but only to Year 10. The nearest secondary schools to Year 12 are in Barcaldine  to the west and Emerald  to the east. Other options are boarding schools and distance education.

Notable residents 

 Arthur Hunter Palmer, Premier of Queensland, owned Beaufort Station

References 

Barcaldine Region
Unbounded localities in Queensland